Conchita Martínez was the defending champion, but was forced to retire in her quarterfinals match against Gala León García.

Anke Huber won the title by defeating Gala León García 7–6(7–4), 6–3 in the final.

Seeds
The first two seeds received a bye into the second round.

Draw

Finals

Top half

Bottom half

References

External links
 Official results archive (ITF)
 Official results archive (WTA)

Women's Singles
Singles